Istebna  is a large village and the seat of Gmina Istebna, Cieszyn County in Silesian Voivodeship, southern Poland. The village is situated in the Silesian Beskids mountain range, near the borders with the Czech Republic and Slovakia, in the historical region of Cieszyn Silesia. The Olza River flows through the village.

Etymology 
The name is cultural in origin derived from the word , meaning a room in a (especially rural) house (see also izba). It is conjectured that the name was conveyed by settlers from Istebné who supposedly established the village. Historically it was also known as Gistebna (1621, 1629) or Istebne (1724; the name in plural form, meaning rooms).

History 
The village was first mentioned in the document from 1592 retrospectively mentioning the village Jistebne as existing in 1583. It belonged then to the Duchy of Teschen, a fee of the Kingdom of Bohemia and a part of the Habsburg monarchy.

After Revolutions of 1848 in the Austrian Empire a modern municipal division was introduced in the re-established Austrian Silesia. The village as a municipality was subscribed to the political district of Cieszyn and the legal district of Jablunkov. According to the censuses conducted in 1880, 1890, 1900 and 1910 the population of the municipality grew from 2,112 in 1880 to 2,245 in 1910 with the majority being native Polish-speakers (between 98.2% and 99.5%) accompanied by German-speaking (at most 33 or 1.5% in 1890) and Czech-speaking people (at most 15 or 0.7% in 1880). In terms of religion in 1910 the majority were Roman Catholics (93.9%), followed by Protestants (5.9%) and Jews (6 people). The village was also traditionally inhabited by Silesian Gorals, speaking Jablunkov dialect.

After World War I, fall of Austria-Hungary, Polish–Czechoslovak War and the division of Cieszyn Silesia in 1920, it became a part of Poland and was transferred to Cieszyn County. It was then annexed by Nazi Germany at the beginning of World War II. After the war it was restored to Poland.

Landmarks 
There is a Catholic Good Shepherd Church in the village, built in 1794 from previous wooden one.

People 
 Emanuel Grim, Catholic priest and writer, worked here and is buried at local cemetery
 Ludwik Konarzewski-junior, Polish painter, sculptor and also artistic educator of children (son of senior)   
 Ludwik Konarzewski-senior, Polish painter, sculptor and also educator of fine arts to young people in Istebna
 Janusz Krężelok, cross-country skier
 Jerzy Kukuczka, high altitude mountaineer, and the second person to climb all of the 8,000 metre peaks (Memorial Chamber dedicated to him is located in its own mountain cottage in Istebna)
 Jan Wałach, drawer, engraver (woodcuts), also sculptor and painter

Twin towns 
  Iława
  Trzebiatów

Gallery

Footnotes

References

External links 
  Official website of Gmina Istebna

Villages in Cieszyn County
Cieszyn Silesia